Rolandas Alijevas (born 20 January 1985) is a Lithuanian professional basketball player of Azeri descent.

Pro career
On 15 April 2011, Alijevas signed a contract with BC Prienai, until the end of the season.

On 28 June 2011, he signed with Budivelnyk Kyiv in Ukraine. On 13 February 2012, he became a member of the Krasnye Krylia basketball club, based in Samara, Russia. He also played for BC Nevėžis, BC Žalgiris, ASVEL Basket, BC Krka, BC Boncourt, Polonia Warszawa, G.S. Olympia Larissa B.C., Phoenix Hagen, BC Šiauliai.

Achievements 
 Nike International Junior Tournament MVP: (2003)
 LKAL Champion: (2003)
 FIBA Europe Under-20 Championship : (2005)
 FIBA Under-21 World Championship : (2005)
 Summer Universiade : (2007)

References

External links
Euroleague.net Profile

1985 births
Living people
ASVEL Basket players
BC Budivelnyk players
BC Krasnye Krylia players
BC Pieno žvaigždės players
BC Žalgiris players
KK Krka players
Lithuanian men's basketball players
Olympia Larissa B.C. players
Phoenix Hagen players
Point guards
Shooting guards
Basketball players at the 2015 European Games
European Games competitors for Azerbaijan
Universiade medalists in basketball
Universiade gold medalists for Lithuania
Medalists at the 2007 Summer Universiade
Basketball players from Kaunas